Fortress Stadium may refer to:

Fortress Stadium (Lahore), shortened as simply Fortress – stadium in Lahore, Pakistan
Hayes Lane, known as the Fortress Stadium for sponsorship purposes – stadium in Bromley, England, United Kingdom
Smederevo Stadium, known as Fortress – stadium in Smederevo, Serbia